Goodsell House is a historic home located at Old Forge in Herkimer County, New York. It was built in 1899 and is a -story, wood-frame vernacular Queen Anne–style house with a gable ell.  The main block is over a limestone foundation.  Also on the property is a -story carriage house/garage and an ice house.  It is operated as a local history museum for the town of Webb.

It was listed on the National Register of Historic Places in 2006.

The Town of Webb Historical Association operates the Goodsell Museum as a museum of local history.

References

External links
Town of Webb Historical Association - official site

Houses on the National Register of Historic Places in New York (state)
History museums in New York (state)
Queen Anne architecture in New York (state)
Houses completed in 1899
Museums in Herkimer County, New York
Houses in Herkimer County, New York
National Register of Historic Places in Herkimer County, New York